Peter Staroň (born 15 May 1973) is a Slovak former professional ice hockey player.

He played with HC Slovan Bratislava in the Slovak Extraliga.

References

1973 births
Living people
HC Slovan Bratislava players
Slovak ice hockey right wingers
HK Nitra players
Grizzlys Wolfsburg players
EK Zell am See players
Slovak expatriate ice hockey players in Germany
Slovak expatriate sportspeople in Austria
Expatriate ice hockey players in Austria
Ice hockey people from Bratislava